Snowbound: The Jim and Jennifer Stolpa Story is a 1994 American television film.

Plot
Snowbound is based on a true story. Jim and Jennifer Stolpa and their infant son Clayton are 500 miles from their home in Castro Valley, California, when they lose their way and are stranded in an endless wilderness of deep snow in northern Nevada, east of Cedarville, California. They battle for survival against the elements when Jim Stolpa drives too far down a snow-covered road and gets stuck during a snowstorm. Using only meager supplies and resourcefulness, the young couple struggles to keep themselves and their son alive in a frozen shelter while awaiting rescue.

Realizing they will not be found and out of supplies, Jim ultimately strikes out on a courageous 50-mile walk through the snow alone, determined to reach help and return to save his family.

Cast (in credits order)
 Neil Patrick Harris as Jim Stolpa
 Kelli Williams as Jennifer Wicker
 Richard Ian Cox as Jason Wicker, Jennifer's younger brother (as Richard Cox)
 Duncan Fraser as Don Patterson
 Susan Clark as Muriel Mulligan, Jim's mother
 Michael Gross as Kevin Mulligan, Jim's stepfather
 Andrew Airlie as Dr. Bonaldi
 Alexander and Zachary Ahnert as Clayton Stolpa
 Shannon and Heather Beaty as Megan Mulligan, Jim's younger half-sister
 Joy Coghill as Dr. Jorgenson
 Kevin McNulty as Joe Tirado
 Roger Barnes as Steve
 J.B. Bivens as Roadblock CHP
 Ken Camroux as Sergeant Satellite
 John B. Destry as Redinger
 Beverley Elliott as Terri
 Tina Gilbertson as Reporter
 Mitchell Kosterman as Deputy (as Mitch Kosterman)
 Catherine Lough Haggquist as Paramedic (as Catherine Lough)
 Randi Lynne as CHP Sergeant
 Walter Marsh as Sheriff Watkins
 Hrothgar Mathews as Rick Frazier
 Arlin McFarlane as Roberta Patterson
 Douglas Newell as Tommy
 Rick Poltaruk as Mechanic
 Phil Reimer as Weatherman
 Robert Toohey as Doug Farley
 Arnie Walters as Uncle Clay
 Shawn Webster as Weatherman
 Dale Wilson as Lt. Jack Reynolds
 Donna Yamamoto as Nurse

Other versions of the story
Jim and Jennifer's story was also used as the plot for the "Lost in the Snow" episode of I Shouldn't Be Alive. The episode originally aired November 3, 2005, and featured Les Stroud analyzing the Stolpas' actions and showing the viewers how to be better prepared for such a situation.

The ordeal was the subject of the first episode of the third season of the ABC documentary series In an Instant titled "Whiteout" which first aired in June 2017.

The Stolpas' story was also told, along with survival tips, in Snowbound with an Infant, episode one of season three of The Weather Channel show SOS: How to Survive, first airing August 11, 2019.

References

External links

1994 films
1994 television films
1990s psychological thriller films
American television films
Films directed by Christian Duguay (director)
Thriller films based on actual events
1990s English-language films
Films set in Nevada
CBS network films
Films set in 1992
Films set in 1993